Konai may be,

Konai language
Kōnai Station, Kōchi, Japan

People
Theodore Bar Konai
Konai Helu Thaman
Rajyadhar Konai